Gabin Dabiré is a singer, guitarist, kora player, and composer from Burkina Faso (former Upper Volta) who has lived in Italy since 1975.

Born in Bobo-Dioulasso in the African state of Burkina Faso, Dabiré’s first experience in music were was lessons from the great masters of the traditional music of Burkina Faso. In 1975 he traveled to Denmark, where he was exposed to European and contemporary music. In 1976 he toured in Italy and afterwards embarked on a study trip of chordophones and Indian percussion.

Career
In 1979 his collection of ethnic music of Western Africa was published by the cultural association and music group Futuro Antico, which he co-founded with Walter Maioli and Riccardo Sinigaglia. The group used synthesized electronic tonalities matching the traditional musics from around the world. Their work was realised in the self-titled recording Futuro Antico in 1980. Also he formed the group ‘Yelbuna’ with some musician friends and performed in several Italian cities.

In order to consolidate the wide-ranging activities he was involved in, including music, cinema and theatre, he founded the Centro Diffusione Promozione Cultura (Culture Promotion Diffusion Centre) in Milan in 1983. This enabled him to present various aspects of African Culture. In 1986 he moved to Tuscany with his family where he organised concerts, and completed the recording of his first CD Kontome ("Spirits"), which was released the following year. In 1992 he started to expand his repertoire to include crossover music, resulting in a successful collaboration with the Gregorian choir ‘Santa Cecilia’.

In 1994 his second CD entitled Afriki Djamana was released by the label Amiata Records. The multi-faceted career of this composer and musician has caused him constantly to research new timbres and sonorities. He has kept his African origins despite using instruments of other continents and working with western musicians.

The group ‘Gabin Dabiré and Musicians’ is inspired by Dabiré’s compositions, using harmonies that maintain the character of African music. The collaboration with the saxophone player Daniele Malvisi and the drummer and percussionist Paolo Corsi, who are both very open minded towards new musical horizons, has allowed Gabin Dabiré and his brother Paul Dabiré to explore sonorities and rhythms.

Presently he plays in a group with Giovanni Conversano (Guitar), Gianmarco Scaglia (Bass), Daniele Malvisi (Sax), Paolo Casu (Drums), Paul Dabiré (percussion instruments). In 2007 he released another Futuro Antico recording with Maioli and Sinigaglia, called Intonazioni Archetipe

Style
Gabin Dabiré's music is broader than the narrow confines of Burkina Faso or even Africa. This may be partly explained by the fact that Dabiré wields the acoustic guitar in the same troubadour tradition of African guitar legends like Jean Bosco Mwenda, S.E. Rogie and Ali Farka Toure. However, he is truly original in layering various sounds over each other. Each song is indelibly stamped with Dabiré's unmistakable trademark tapestry whereby the sound of one instrument is woven into the next, creating sparkling sound waves.

Performances
Gabin has played with Cecilia Chailly, Manu Katché, Walter Maioli, Dominic Miller, Pino Palladino, and Matteo Silva.

Discography
 Kontômè (Spirits) (New Sound Planet, 1990)
 Afriki Djamana: Music from Burkina Faso (Amiata, 1994)
 Daby-Bâ with Bruno Genero Ensemble (QDS, 1996)
 African Angels (Amiata, 1997)
 World Music Atlas (Amharsi Srl/Amiata, 1997)
 Colors (Amiata, 1998)
 Africa X – Zokue Kpole (2000)
 Tieru (Intuition, 2002)
 The New Orleans Jig (EthnicPiano, 2004) with Antoni O'Breskey

With Futuro Antico
 Correnti Magnetiche (1980, tape - reissued on LP & CD in 2014)
 Ethnoelectronic Music (1983, split-tape with Esplorazione)
 Dai Primitivi All'Elettronica" (1990, LP - recorded in 1980 - reissued on LP & CD in 2014)
 Intonazioni Archetipe (2007 - recorded in 2005)
 Isole del Suono'' (2016 - live in Italy 1980)

References

External links
Official web site
Sound Center page for Futuro Antico
Faso/ Banning Eyre's Burkino Faso page at the Afropop site

Burkinabé male singers
Living people
Burkinabé expatriates in Italy
People from Bobo-Dioulasso
Year of birth missing (living people)
21st-century Burkinabé people